Damir Lesjak (born 31 March 1967) is a former Croatian footballer who played for Dinamo Zagreb, Israeli side Hapoel Haifa and Belgian club Mouscron.

Club career
Born in Čakovec, Lesjak joined Dinamo Zagreb's academy as a promising young player and Yugoslavia U21 international before turning professional and joining the first team squad in the 1986–87 season. He immediately made an impact and appeared in 19 Yugoslav First League matches in his debut season. He went on to establish himself as a regular member of Dinamo's defensive line-up, and played along other Dinamo greats such as Zvonimir Boban, Davor Šuker and Dražen Ladić in the following years.

He won the 1992–93 Prva HNL and the 1994 Croatian Cup with Dinamo, and made a total of 510 appearances and scored 8 goals for the club (including 177 appearances and 7 goals in the Yugoslav First League and later in the Prva HNL) before moving abroad and joining Israel's Hapoel Haifa. After finishing fourth with Hapoel in the 1995–96 season, Lesjak moved to Mouscron where he spent the last three seasons of his career playing in the Belgian First Division before retiring in 1999.

References

External links

1967 births
Living people
Sportspeople from Čakovec
Association football defenders
Yugoslav footballers
Croatian footballers
GNK Dinamo Zagreb players
Hapoel Haifa F.C. players
Royal Excel Mouscron players
Yugoslav First League players
Croatian Football League players
Liga Leumit players
Belgian Pro League players
Croatian expatriate footballers
Expatriate footballers in Israel
Croatian expatriate sportspeople in Israel
Expatriate footballers in Belgium
Croatian expatriate sportspeople in Belgium